Hoplobatrachus is a genus of frogs in the family Dicroglossidae. This genus is found in both Sub-Saharan Africa and southern and southeastern Asia. It is the sister taxon of Euphlyctis, although there is some evidence that it might be paraphyletic with respect to Euphlyctis. These frogs are sometimes known as the crowned bullfrogs or the tiger frogs.

Species
Hoplobatrachus has five described species:
 Hoplobatrachus crassus (Jerdon, 1854)
 Hoplobatrachus litoralis Hasan, Kuramoto, Islam, Alam, Khan, and Sumida, 2012
 Hoplobatrachus occipitalis (Günther, 1858)
 Hoplobatrachus rugulosus (Wiegmann, 1834)
 Hoplobatrachus tigerinus (Daudin, 1802)

References

 
Dicroglossidae
Amphibians of Sub-Saharan Africa
Amphibians of Asia
Amphibian genera
Taxa named by Wilhelm Peters